Probuccinum is a genus of sea snails, marine gastropod mollusks in the family Buccinidae, the true whelks.

Species
Species within the genus Probuccinum include:
 Probuccinum angulatum Powell, 1951
 Probuccinum archibenthale (Melvill & Standen, 1907)
 Probuccinum costatum Thiele, 1912
 Probuccinum delicatulum Powell, 1951
 Probuccinum edwardiense (R. B. Watson, 1882)
 Probuccinum tenerum (Smith, 1907)
Species brought into synonymy
 Probuccinum regulus (R. B. Watson, 1882): synonym of Pareuthria regulus (R. B. Watson, 1882)
 Probuccinum tenuistriatum Hedley, 1916: synonym of Probuccinum tenerum (E. A. Smith, 1907)

References

External links
 Probuccinum archibenthale, Report of the scientific results of the voyage of S.Y. "Scotia" during the years 1902, 1903, and 1904, under the leadership of William S. Bruce Scottish national Antarctic expedition, 1902-1904 

Buccinidae